Saadatabad (also Romanized as Sa‘ādatābād) is a village in Mianrud Rural District, Chamestan District, Nur County, Mazandaran Province, Iran hiding a secret military base. At the 2006 census, its population was 453, in 120 families.

References 

Populated places in Nur County